Cabannes may refer to:
 Cabannes, Bouches-du-Rhône, in the Bouches-du-Rhône department
 Jean Cabannes (1885–1959), a French physicist
 Jean Cabannes (magistrate) (1925–2020), a French jurist
 Cabannes (crater), a lunar crater

See also
 Les Cabannes (disambiguation)
 Cabanes (disambiguation)
 Cabanès (disambiguation)